William Elson may refer to:

Billy Elson, footballer
William Elson (died 1705), MP for Chichester
William Elson (died 1727), MP for Chichester